Benjamin F. Harwood (c. 1818 – March 30, 1856 in Albany, New York) was an American lawyer and politician from New York.

Life
He lived in Dansville, Livingston County, New York.

In 1853, he was elected on the Whig ticket Clerk of the New York Court of Appeals, being in office from 1854 until his death.

He died a few days after the Court of Appeals declared Governor Myron H. Clark's prohibition law to be void. Harwood suffered from alcoholism himself, and felt the decision "to be his death warrant."

Sources
The Annals of Albany by Joel Munsell (page 333)
The New York Civil List compiled by Franklin Benjamin Hough (page 348; Weed, Parsons and Co., 1858)
Report of the Executive Committee of the American Temperance Union (1856; page 16)

1810s births
1856 deaths
People from Dansville, New York
Clerks of the New York Court of Appeals